Softball was contested by participating nations at the 1987 Pan American Games in Indianapolis, Indiana, United States.

Medal summary

Medal table

Medalists

Softball at the Pan American Games
Events at the 1987 Pan American Games
1987 in softball
International softball competitions hosted by the United States
Softball in Indiana